Komsomol (Komsomol, كومسومول), also known as Komsomol'skiy, (Komsomol'skiy) is a town in Atyrau Region, west Kazakhstan.

References

Atyrau Region
Cities and towns in Kazakhstan